In mathematics, the Fabius function is an example of an infinitely differentiable function that is nowhere analytic, found by . It was also written down as the Fourier transform of
 

The Fabius function is defined on the unit interval, and is given by the cumulative distribution function of

The sequence of intervals within which this function is positive or negative follows the same pattern as the Thue–Morse sequence.

Values
The Fabius function is constant zero for all non-positive arguments, and assumes rational values at positive dyadic rational arguments.

References

 (an English translation of the author's paper published in Spanish in 1982)
Types of functions
 Alkauskas, Giedrius  (2001), "Dirichlet series associated with Thue-Morse sequence", preprint.
 Rvachev, V. L., Rvachev, V. A., "Non-classical methods of the approximation theory in boundary value problems", Naukova Dumka, Kiev (1979) (in Russian).